Ghana competed at the 1968 Summer Olympics in Mexico City, Mexico.

Results by event

Athletics
Men's 100 metres
 Michael Ahey
 Round 1 — 10.5 s (→ 3rd in heat, advanced to round 2)
 Round 2 — 10.4 s (→ 8th in heat, did not advance)

Women's 200 metres
 Alice Anum
 Round 1 — 23.9 s (→ 7th in heat, did not advance)

Men's 400 metres
 Samuel Bugri
 Round 1 — 45.8 s (→ 4th in heat, advanced to round 2)
 Round 2 — 46.0 s (→ 4th in heat, advanced to semi final)
 Semi final — 45.9 s (→ 5th in heat, did not advance)

Men's 800 metres
 John Ametepey
 Round 1 — 1:50.7 min (→ 4th in heat, did not advance)

Men's 400 metres hurdles
 William Quaye
 Round 1 — 51.6 s (→ 6th in heat, did not advance)

Men's 4x100 metres relay
 Edward Owusu, Michael Ahey, William Quaye, James Addy
 Round 1 — 39.8 s (→ 6th in heat, semi final)
 Semi final — 39.9 s (→ 5th in heat, did not advance)

Men's long jump
 Michael Ahey
 Qualification — 7.77 m (→ advanced to the final)
 Final — 7.71 m (→ 13th place)
 Johnson Amoah
 Qualification — DNS (→ did not advance)

Women's long jump
 Alice Anum
 Qualification — 5.61 m (→ advanced to the final)

Men's triple jump
 Johnson Amoah
 Qualification — 15.65 m (→ did not advance)

Boxing
Light flyweight (48 kg)
 Joseph Destimo
 Round of 16 — Beat Walter Henry of Canada
 Quarterfinal — Lost to Servilio Oliveira of Brazil

Bantamweight (54 kg)
 Sulley Shittu
 Round 1 — Beat Dary Dasuda of Niger
 Round 2 — Beat Gyula Szabó of Hungary
 Round of 16 - Lost to Horst Rascher of West Germany

Lightweight (60 kg)
 Joe Martey
 Round 1 — Lost to Enzo Petriglia of Italy

Light welterweight (63.5 kg)
 Emmanuel Lawson
 Round 2 — Lost to Jaime Lozano of Mexico

Welterweight (67 kg)
 Aaron Popoola
 Round 2 — Lost to Celal Sandal of Turkey

Light middleweight (71 kg)
 Prince Amartey
 Round 1 — Beat Abdalla Abdel of Sudan
 Round of 16 — Lost to Eric Blake of Great Britain

Middleweight (75 kg)
 George Aidoo
 Round of 16 — DNS

Heavyweight (81 kg)
 Adonis Ray
 Round of 16 — Lost to Joaquin Rocha of Mexico

Football (soccer)
Men
Preliminary Round (Group C)

Team roster
 ( 1.) ?
 ( 2.) ?
 ( 3.) ?
 ( 4.) John Eshun
 ( 5.) Charles Addo
 ( 6.) Ibrahim Sunday
 ( 7.) Osei Kofi
 ( 8.) Jones Atuquayefio
 ( 9.) George Alhassan
 (10.) Gbadamosi Amusa
 (11.) Sammy Sampene
 (12.) ?
 (13.) John Naawu
 (14.) Joseph Wilson
 (15.) Jabir Malik
 (16.) Oliver Acquah
 (17.) Jonathan Kpakpo
 (18.) George Foley
 Gariba Abukari
 Bernard Kusi

References
Official Olympic Reports
Part Three: Results

Nations at the 1968 Summer Olympics
1968
Olympics